Mahonia trifoliolata is a species of flowering plant in the family Berberidaceae, in southwestern North America. Common names include agarita, agrito, algerita, currant-of-Texas, wild currant, and chaparral berry.  The name Agarita comes from the Spanish verb agarrar, which means "to grab". The ending "-ita" is often added to little things, so agarita means "grabs a little". This was probably said because the bush is a bit scratchy but does not have significant spines. Typical characteristics are grey-green to blue-grey leaves, yellow flowers in February to April and the red berries appearing in May. The most important harvest organ are the berries, though the roots and seeds can also be used.

Distribution
The shrub is native to Arizona, New Mexico, and Texas in the Southwestern United States, and across northeastern Mexico as far south as Durango and San Luis Potosí. It mainly grows in areas that it is native in; there is no cultivation in other countries. states.  In Texas, it is found on rocky slopes and cliffs, and in thickets and open woods, from coastal South Texas northwest to the Trans-Pecos region. It is one of the most common bushes in Hill Country.

Especially large coverage can be found on the Edwards Plateau in Texas. Mechanical and chemical control have been attempted, but few economically viable results have been achieved due to agarita's quick recovery ability and its resistance to many herbicides.

There are also no ethnographic records describing the use of the species Mahonia trifoliolata, but a number of records indicate the use of Mahonia haematocarpa and Mahonia repens by the Native Americans of the Plains. Virtually every part of the plant has been used for food, medicine and dye throughout history.

Description
It has rigid and spreading branches, often forming thickets. The foliage is gray-green to blue-gray, and the leaflets have sharp points at the ends.

Taxonomy and cultivars
Several authorities consider the entire genus Mahonia as part of Berberis, in which case the scientific name becomes Berberis trifoliolata. Among the species native to Texas (Mahonia trifoliolata), agarita has three less common strains: The Texas barberry (Mahonia swaseyi), the red barberry (Mahonia haematocarpa), and the creeping barberry (Mahonia repens). The Texas barberry is relatively rare and is found only in a handful of Texan counties. The red barberry is native to the Southwestern United States and grows in juniper woodlands and desert grasslands. The creeping barberry grows at high elevations amidst aspen conifers and is mostly found in the Rocky Mountains. All four strains have edible berries, but the fruit of the creeping barberry is dark blue, while the berries of the Texas and the red barberry are bright red.

Uses
The plant is well adapted to hot temperatures and dry conditions. In areas where it occurs naturally, it is also liked by many wild animals. Birds like to eat the fruits, small mammals use the plant for cover. The shrub is also considered to be a good nectar source for honey bees and other insects. As the trifoliate leaves are tough and spiny, they aren't eaten by cattle or deer.

The bright red edible fruits of the agarita can be harvested around late April to early May. The fruits contain a slightly sweet and sour juice; when expelled, the juice can be used to produce an agarita wine or consumed as a fruit juice drink. The berries can also be used for jelly, pie or cobblers; the tart flavor is reported to be pleasant to eat when mixed with sugar. The fruits contain seeds and can be used to germinate new agarita plants, or be roasted as a coffee alternative. However, a high quantity of seeds makes raw consumption difficult.

Native Americans of the Apache, Chiricahua, and Mescalero tribes used the fresh and preserved fruit for food, and the wood shavings as a traditional eye medicine and a yellow dye for hides. During early pioneering years, the alkaloid berberine in the agarita roots was used to make a yellow dye. Agarita also has uses in medicine; its medicinal value is created mainly by the alkaloids in the roots, and throughout history, it was used to treat ailments ranging from fevers to stomach troubles and open wounds. It was also used as a laxative by the Ramah Navajo and other groups native to the Pacific Northwest. The roots are known to possess antiseptic qualities and are therefore used to treat wounds, skin or gum problems.

Cultivation
Mahonia trifoliolata is cultivated as an ornamental plant for use in desert-region gardens. Mahonia trifoliolata is exceptionally drought and heat tolerant. Thus, they also grow in dry periods without being watered. It usually grows best in full sun, but it can also be cultivated in light shade. Additionally, the plant is not very cold tolerant and is therefore especially grown in places where winters are short and mild.
The plant can be reproduced generatively with the seeds. The seeds need a cold stratification of two to three months. Therefore, it can be sown through summer or autumn and the seeds then germinate in spring. As it is a Perennial plant, it doesn't need to be sown yearly and has a very long lifespan.
Mahonia trifoliolata tolerates a variety of soil textures like Loam, Clay, clay-loam and Gravel. It usually grows very well in dry, well-drained soils. Usually, the plant occurs on soils derived from Limestone parent material and therefore tolerates Alkali soil.

There are not many known insect or disease problems in agarita. Sometimes leaf spots and rusts - especially black stem rust - may occur. Stem rust, caused by the fungus Puccinia graminis, is an agriculturally important disease in wheat, barley, oats, rye and triticale. Since Mahonia trifoliolata acts as an intermediate host, farmers usually remove the bushes to reduce the prevalence of disease. In the regions where Mahonia trifoliolata is grown nowadays,  the climate is too arid to allow for the cultivation of cereals; hence, there is no need to remove the agarita bushes.

As the roots contain large amount of the alkaloid berberine, they inhibit some root fungi and are therefore relatively resistant to pathogens.

Biology

Growth, development, physiology
Reproduction occurs through seeds and sprouts. The seed is produced and dispersed during summer, it usually germinates in the following spring. Dispersal happens through a variety of birds and mammals. The sprouts represent the vegetative reproduction; they usually  grow from the roots or the root crown. This growth is especially vigorous when the above ground vegetation is removed or damaged (through fires, cutting, etc.). 
The  flowers usually bloom from February until March. The berries ripen from April to July, but peak ripeness is usually already reached in May.

Interactions: pests, diseases
Agarita is often used by birds as a nesting side or as protection from predators; it can also shelter seedlings of other trees and shrubs through their delicate stage, since grazing animals won't be able to get them. Birds eat the berries, while bees and butterflies commonly feed on the nectar found in the flowers. Since agarita blooms quite early, it represents one of the only nectar sources during the early spring.

Gallery

References

trifoliolata
Flora of Northeastern Mexico
Flora of the Southwestern United States
Flora of the South-Central United States
Plants used in Native American cuisine
Plants used in traditional Native American medicine
Plants described in 1901
Garden plants of North America
Flora without expected TNC conservation status